Sushil Kumar Prasad (born 12 August 1959) is an Indian former cricketer. He played first-class cricket for Delhi and Orissa between 1982 and 1996.

See also
 List of Delhi cricketers

References

External links
 

1959 births
Living people
Indian cricketers
Delhi cricketers
Odisha cricketers
Cricketers from Delhi